MISC Berhad was incorporated in 1968 as Malaysia International Shipping Corporation Berhad and is the leading international shipping line of Malaysia. In September 2005, Malaysia International Shipping Corporation Berhad adopted its present corporate identity and changed its name to MISC Berhad. Its main shareholder is Petroliam Nasional Berhad (Petronas), the national oil conglomerate of Malaysia. The principal business of the corporation consist of ship owning, ship operating, other shipping related activities, owning and operating of offshore floating facilities as well as marine repair, marine conversion and engineering and construction works.

History 
Malaysia International Shipping Corporation was founded in 1968 by Robert Kuok on request of the Malaysian government. Kuok, who had no experience in the business, sought the help of the Hong Kong-Chinese shipping magnate, Frank Tsao. For his help with establishing the business, Tsao was conferred the title of Tan Sri by the King of Malaysia.

The company's first two ships were provided by Japan, given to the Malaysian Chinese Association (MCA) as compensation for its massacre of Chinese Malaysians during World War II. The company initially had capital of 10 million ringgit, with the Kuok brothers holding 20%, Tsao 15%, and the MCA and other Chinese-Malaysian groups holding 20 to 30%. Ismail Abdul Rahman served as the company's first chairman until Kuok took over in 1969, serving until the 1980s. Eddie Shih and Tony Goh ran the day-to-day business, and the company quickly prospered after it started business in 1969.

Under pressure from Prime Minister Abdul Razak Hussein, MISC soon enlarged its capital base from the original 100 to 140, with the extra 40 issued to the Malaysian government, which became the largest shareholder. The company went public in 1987.

Business speciality
MISC is a specialist in Energy Transportation. The company HQ is located at Menara Dayabumi in Kuala Lumpur, Malaysia. With 29 LNG carriers, it is currently one of the world's leading operator of LNG fleet. Through its wholly owned subsidiary AET, MISC is one of the leading global tanker operators and a market leader in lightering operations for US Gulf ship-to-ship transfers.

MISC also freights vegetable oil and chemical products, with major trading routes that include South East Asia, the Far East, Middle East, Europe, the Indian Subcontinent and the Americas.

The company has also ventured into offshore business, offering customers a full scope of offshore floating facility services – from design to operations. Through Malaysia Marine and Heavy Engineering Sdn Bhd (MMHE), MISC provides marine repair, marine conversion, engineering and construction for a wide spectrum of oil & gas production facilities.

On 24 November 2011, MISC announced its exit from the liner business (container shipping). In its announcement through the local Bursa Malaysia stock exchange, MISC explained that the radical change in the operating dynamics of the liner industry which is driven by high operating cost and rapid changes in global trade patterns is challenging the validity of today's operating models. The company's decision was also hastened by the present difficult operating conditions which have seen the liner business suffering a total financial loss of US$789 million over the past three years, impacting the overall financial performance of MISC.

Other services

Maritime Education 
 Malaysian Maritime Academy

The fleet
The corporation operates a fleet of 125 vessels consisting of (as at February 2014):
 29 LNG Carriers
 Seri "C" - Class, 5 launched 
 Seri "B" - Class, 5 ship
 Seri "A" - Class, 5 ships
 Puteri Satu - Class, 6 ships
 Puteri - Class, 5 ships
 Tenaga - Class, 3 ships
 Aman - Class, 2 ships
 Note:  Tenaga Satu and Tenaga Empat have been converted into LNG Floating Storage Units
(FSUs) for the Petronas LNG Regasification Facilities project in Sungai Udang, Malacca.
 75 Petroleum Tankers
 VLCC - Class, 13 ships
 Aframax - Class, 50 ships
 Suezmax - Class, 4 ships
 DP Shuttle - Class, 2 ships
 Panamax - Class, 1 ships
 CPP - Class, 5 ships
 22 Chemical Tankers
 Melati Class, 1 ship
 Bunga A Class, 7 ships
 Bunga B Class, 4 ships
 Bunga L Class, 6 ships
 Bunga Kantan Class, 3 ships
 Others, 2 ships
 Offshore Terminals
 FPSO, 5 terminals
 FSO, 5 terminals
 MOPU, 2 units
 FSU, 2 units
 Semi-FPS, 1 unit

Incidents
 On 19 August 2008 at 10.09 pm, one of the MISC vessel registered as MT Bunga Melati Dua has been hijacked by a group of armed pirates at the Gulf of Aden, between Yemen and Somalia. There were 29 Malaysian nationals and 10 Philippine nationals on board the ship when the incident occurred. According to Bernama, MISC together with International Maritime Bureau (IMB) has formed a special team to tackle the problem on the attack.
 On 29 August 2008 at 9.50 pm another MISC tanker ship registered as MT Bunga Melati Lima also has been hijacked in international waters off the coast of Yemen. According to MISC press statement, there are 36 Malaysians and five Filipino temporary maintenance crew members on board, the vessel was fully laden with 30,000 Mt of petrochemicals when the pirates boarded it on Friday evening.
 On 22 January 2011 MISC tanker vessel Bunga Laurel was Hijacked by Somali pirates. The previous Container vessel Bunga Mas Lima, which now is converted as military escort vessel, has rescued all 23 crew members. All 18 pirates surrendered.
 On 26 July 2012, Bunga Alpinia, one of MISC oil tankers, caught fire while filling methanol in Labuan's Petronas Chemicals Group Berhad's jetty at 2.32am after being struck by a lightning during the bad weather. Beside the vessel itself, bulk  vessel, MV Heroic, also were closed to that vessel. Because it was berthed near Rancha-Rancha village, a series of mega explosions were heard across the village and prompts Sabah Electricity to cut electrical suppliments to the houses near to the razed vessel. 6 crew were killed and 24 others were rescued by nearby offshore vessels and TLDM and MMEA vessels. The perished crews were Syahril Azmi Baharudin, 28, and Khalil Mohd Hanafi, 24, both from Melaka, Muhd Nazrin Khamsani, 24, from Kuala Lumpur, Zahari Hassim, 46, from Negeri Sembilan and a Filipino, Colanggoy Calaluan Errol, 22. All were presumably missing in initial reports. A group of offshore vessels, led by MV Pacific Hawk, successfully extinguished the flames at 7.05am on next day.

See also 
 Johor Port
 Kuantan Port
 Port Klang
 Port of Tanjung Pelepas

References

1968 establishments in Malaysia
Petronas
Shipping companies of Malaysia
Companies based in Kuala Lumpur
Transport companies established in 1968
Malaysian companies established in 1968
Companies listed on Bursa Malaysia
Government-owned companies of Malaysia
Malaysian brands
Tanker shipping companies